Honey sucker may refer to:

 Honeyeater, a bird
 Honeysucker (truck), a vacuum truck used to empty septic tanks and latrines
 Gyrinocheilus aymonieri, the Chinese algae eater